The Monument to the 1st Rhode Island Regiment at Yorktown Heights, New York was erected on May 13, 1982 on the grounds of the First Presbyterian Church to commemorate the valiant efforts of a Revolutionary War unit composed predominantly of black soldiers that fought on May 14, 1781 under the command of Colonel Christopher Greene.

History
The Monument was installed thanks to the civic advocacy of African American historian and Westchester community leader John H. Harmon; Harmon was the founder in 1969 of the Afro-American Cultural Foundation as well as executive director   and the monument is a legacy of that institution.

An engraved plaque on a large stone marker calls attention to the patriotism of the First Rhode Island Regiment; 140 out of 225 soldiers were Black, the largest percentage by far in any of the integrated armies. While the valor of two white officers and a guide killed in the deadly skirmish known as the Battle of Pine's Bridge had been commemorated earlier with a plaque at the site in 1900, the deaths and bravery of more than 40 men defending America's freedom had been overlooked.

The monument was added to the African American Heritage Trail of Westchester County in 2004 as part of a mission to “preserve and interpret the legacy and contributions that people of African descent have made to the development of our unique American identity.” It is one of only 14 such sites. It was sponsored by the Afro-American Cultural Foundation of Westchester County together with the Rhode Island Black Heritage Society.

References

African-American history of New York (state)
African diaspora
Historic trails and roads in New York (state)
Cultural heritage of the United States
Tourist attractions in Westchester County, New York
African-American military monuments and memorials
African-American history of Westchester County, New York
Yorktown, New York
1982 establishments in New York (state)